Cornbury Music Festival is an annual music festival that takes place in Great Tew Park in Oxfordshire, England.

History

Cornbury Festival was founded by music promoter Hugh Phillimore.

It was originally set up on Robin Cayzer, 3rd Baron Rotherwick’s Oxfordshire estate, Cornbury Park, and has been given the nickname “Poshstock” in national press. The festival moved to Great Tew Park in 2011.

The 2017 edition of the festival was originally announced as the last, but this decision was subsequently reversed

Recent Headliners
2022: Bryan Adams, James Blunt, Ronan Keating
2019: The Specials, Keane, The Beach Boys
2018: Squeeze, Alanis Morissette, UB40
2017: Bryan Adams, the Pretenders, Jools Holland, Kaiser Chiefs
2012: James Morrison, Elvis Costello, Jools Holland
2011: Ray Davies
2010: Noisettes, Candi Staton, Dr John, David Gray, Seth Lakeman, Jackson Browne
2009: The Pretenders
2007: The Proclaimers, Suzanne Vega, Hothouse Flowers, Echo & the Bunnymen
2006: Robert Plant

Notable Attendees
David Cameron attended the festival with his wife Samantha in both 2008 and 2012

Mark Carney attended in 2012

References

External links 
 www.cornburyfestival.com

Music festivals established in 2004
2004 establishments in England
Music festivals in Oxfordshire